Anthony Freskyn Charles Hamby Chaplin, 3rd Viscount Chaplin (14 December 1906 – 18 December 1981) was a British hereditary peer and an amateur zoologist and musician.

Biography
Born in 1906, Chaplin was the son of Eric Chaplin, 2nd Viscount Chaplin, and the Hon Gwladys Wilson, daughter of Charles Wilson, 1st Baron Nunburnholme and Florence Wellesley. He was educated at Radley College.

During 1935 and 1936, Chaplin went on a zoological expedition to New Guinea. He was Secretary of the Zoological Society of London between 1952 and 1955, and a member of its Council.

Chaplin studied musical composition in Paris with Nadia Boulanger between 1936 and 1939. He served as an Officer in the Royal Air Force from 1940 until 1946, achieving the rank of Flight Lieutenant.

Chaplin succeeded his father as 3rd Viscount Chaplin in 1949.

Marriages & children
Chaplin was married firstly on 9 January 1933 to Alvilde Bridges (1909–1994), the only daughter of Lt Gen Sir Tom Bridges.  They had one daughter:

 Hon Oenone Clarissa Chaplin (12 April 1934 – 8 October 2021)

The marriage to Alvilde was dissolved in 1950 and on 16 March 1951 he married secondly the Hon Rosemary Lyttelton (1922–2003), daughter of Oliver Lyttelton, 1st Viscount Chandos and Lady Moira Osborne. They had two daughters:

 Hon Miranda Amadea Chaplin (born 3 January 1956)
 Hon Christina Susanna Chaplin (born 16 December 1958)

Lord Chaplin died in 1981 in Belgravia, London, when in the absence of male heirs, the viscountcy became extinct.

Ancestry

References

External links
 ‘CHAPLIN’, Who Was Who, A & C Black, 1920–2008; online edn, Oxford University Press, Dec 2007 accessed 21 May 2011

1906 births
1981 deaths
20th-century British zoologists
Viscounts in the Peerage of the United Kingdom
Secretaries of the Zoological Society of London
People educated at Radley College